Embsay railway station is a railway station on the Embsay and Bolton Abbey Steam Railway. It serves the small village of Embsay in North Yorkshire, England. The station is a terminus on the railway and was re-opened in 1981.

History 
The original station was on the Skipton to Ilkley Line of the Midland Railway and opened on 1 October 1888. It was later modernised by the London, Midland and Scottish railway (LMS), and eventually closed as part of the Beeching Axe on 22 March 1965. The station was re-opened by the Yorkshire Dales Railway (Embsay Railway) on 22 February 1981, and has been refurbished to resemble its appearance in the days of the LMS.

In December 2004, the TV soap Emmerdale used the station for the location of Hotten station.

A Midland Railway signal box, dating from 1892, and designed to add character to the station, was opened on 6 February 2008.

Information 
The railway station site includes:
The ticket office
The gift shop
The Embsay book shop
The car park
The engine sheds

Gallery

See also 

Addingham (Proposed)
Bolton Abbey
Holywell Halt
Skipton (Proposed)

References

External links 

A history of the Embsay Railway
National Rail Enquires information on Embsay
Embsay station bookshop official website
Emmerdale filming pictures

Heritage railway stations in North Yorkshire
Craven District
Railway stations in Great Britain opened in 1888
Railway stations in Great Britain closed in 1965
Railway stations in Great Britain opened in 1981
Beeching closures in England
Former Midland Railway stations